Nikolskoye is a rural locality (a village) in Chuchkovskoye Rural Settlement, Sokolsky District, Vologda Oblast, Russia. The population was 14 as of 2002.

Geography 
The distance to Sokol is 87 km, to Chuchkovo is 5 km. Vaskovo is the nearest rural locality.

References 

Rural localities in Sokolsky District, Vologda Oblast